The National Black Marathoners' Association (NBMA) is a not-for-profit organization. The executive director and co-founder is Anthony (Tony) Reed, the first Black person in the world to run marathons on all seven continents in 2007. It was formed in 2004 and held its first Annual Summit at the 2005 Lewis and Clark Marathon in St. Charles, MO. The organization offers college scholarships to high school distance runners. In 2013, they recognized the accomplishments of African American distance runners through their National Black Distance Running Hall of Fame and Achievement Awards Events. The organization is open to everyone, regardless of their running or walking ability or distance. 

In 2021, they focused on African American women runners with the documentary, Breaking Three Hours: Trailblazing African American Women Marathoners.

National Black Marathoners Association “1865 Free to Run” Logo

Since 2004, the National Black Marathoners' Association's (NBMA) official logo has been a symbolic race number. The Thirteenth Amendment to the Constitution abolished "slavery and involuntary servitude" on December 6, 1865. After that date, Blacks were supposed to be "Free to Run" without interference.

Annual summits
The Association's annual summits are occasionally held in partnership with major races including the 2018 Baltimore Running Festival, the 2019 Little Rock Marathon, the 2020 St. Jude Marathon, and 2021 Flying Pig Marathon.

References 

Organizations established in 2004
Running clubs